Pattinarendrapur is a village in Khutahan Block, Shahganj Tehsil, Jaunpur District, Varanasi division, Uttar Pradesh, India.
Its Postal Code is 223102.

Colleges 
 National Inter College( NIC )
प्राथमिक विद्यालय

Banks
 Union Bank of India
 State Bank of India
 State Bank of India - Mini Branch

ATM's 
 Union Bank of India ATM
 State Bank of India ATM

Two wheeler showrooms 
 Maa Durga Honda
 Hero MotoCorp
 Bajaj Auto

Transportation

Road 
Pattinarendrapur is well connected to Shahganj, Khutahan and Jaunpur. Frequent buses as well as jeeps are available from here.

Rail 
Nearest railway station to this village is Shahganj Railway Station from where there are direct trains to Mumbai, Delhi, Ahmedabad, Varanasi, Allahabad, etc

References

Villages in Jaunpur district